The Farm: Angola, USA is a 1998 award-winning documentary set in the notorious and largest American  maximum-security prison, Louisiana State Penitentiary, known as Angola. Loosely based on articles published in Life Sentences, drawn from the prison magazine, The Angolite, the film was directed and produced by Jonathan Stack and Liz Garbus. Wilbert Rideau, a life prisoner who had been editor of the magazine since 1975, also participated in direction and was credited on the film.

The film follows the lives of six prison inmates, including Rideau, who tell their own stories of life, death, and survival in a world that few manage to leave. It was filmed during the early years of the long tenure of Warden Burl Cain (1995–2016), who is credited with reducing violence at the prison and establishing many programs to support rehabilitation of the men.

The film was nominated for an Academy Award for Best Documentary Feature. It won the Sundance Film Festival Grand Jury prize, and both the New York and the Los Angeles Film Critics awards for Best Documentary of ‘98. After airing on A&E, it won an Emmy Award.

Years later, Stack followed up with the documentary The Farm: 10 Down (2009), exploring the lives of the survivors of this group 10 years later. One man had been executed and one had died during the making of the first film. Ten years later, three men had gained freedom; two of the first six remained in prison.

Awards
 Sundance Film Festival – Grand Jury Prize, 1998
 Academy Awards – Best Documentary Feature: Nominee, 1999
 Doubletake Documentary Film Festival – Audience Award, 1998
 Emmy Awards – 1999
Outstanding Achievement in Non-Fiction Programming – Cinematography
Outstanding Achievement in Non-Fiction Programming – Picture Editing
Outstanding Achievement in Non-Fiction Programming – Sound Editing: Nominee
Outstanding Non-Fiction Special: Nominee
 Santa Barbara International Film Festival – Best Documentary, 2000
 Florida Film Festival – Grand Jury Prize, 1998
 San Francisco Film Festival – Golden Gate Award, 1998
 New York Film Critics Circle – Best Non-Fiction Film, 1998
 National Society of Film Critics – Best Non-Fiction Film, 1999
 Los Angeles Film Critics Association – Best Documentary Film, 1999
 Taos Talking Pictures Film Festival – Taos Land Grant Award: Nominee, 1998
 Thurgood Marshall Award, 1999
 Satellite Awards – Best Documentary: Nominee – 1998

References

External links

The Farm: Angola, USA at Seventh Art Releasing

1998 films
1998 documentary films
American documentary films
Primetime Emmy Award-winning broadcasts
Films directed by Liz Garbus
Films directed by Jonathan Stack
Documentary films about incarceration in the United States
Documentary films about African Americans
Films shot in Louisiana
Documentary films about Louisiana
1998 directorial debut films
1990s English-language films
1990s American films